War (translit. Voina) is a 2002 Russian war film by Aleksei Balabanov about the realities of the Second Chechen War, starring Aleksei Chadov and Ian Kelly.

Plot 
The film begins with the protagonist, former conscript Ivan Yermakov (Alexei Chadov), being interviewed by a journalist in a detention center. As he begins recounting his story, the film cuts to Chechnya in the summer of 2001, during the Second Chechen War. Held captive by Chechen warlord Aslan Gugayev (Georgy Gurguliya), Ivan and another conscript, Fedya, serve as domestic slaves, while Aslan also uses Ivan as a communications specialist. Eventually, Aslan's militants also capture English actor John Boyle (Ian Kelly) and his fiancée Margaret Michaelsen (Ingeborga Dapkūnaitė). After a while, Ivan, Fedya, and the two English prisoners are taken to another aul and put into a zindan where they find Captain Medvedev (Sergei Bodrov, Jr.), who is paralyzed due to injury.

Aslan releases John so that he can raise £2 million ransom for Margaret's release. Along with John, he releases Ivan and Fedya, as no-one is willing to pay for them.

John's efforts to raise money are unsuccessful, but one British television company offered to provide him with financial assistance in exchange for extensive video footage of the operation. In Moscow, John again runs into the complete indifference of military officials and instead decides to ask Ivan to help him rescue Margaret.

Ivan's life in Tobolsk is not working out. He cannot adapt to a peaceful civilian life, and he cannot find work due to fears over his potentially unbalanced psyche after Chechen captivity. Before that, he comes to St. Petersburg, to the family of Captain Medvedev, whom no one is willing to rescue. When John comes to Tobolsk, Ivan agrees to go back to Chechnya in exchange for money. After passing through Moscow and Vladikavkaz, Ivan and John covertly enter Chechnya, seizing an SUV with a large number of weapons in the trunk en route. On their way, they kidnap a local, Ruslan Shamayev (Euclid Kyurdzidis), and Ivan finds the road to Gugayev's aul. After waiting for a large group of militants to depart, Ivan, John, and Ruslan attack the aul. Having killed the guards with the weapons they had seized earlier, they find Margaret with Captain Medvedev and discover that the militants had raped her. Enraged, John kills Gugayev, further complicating the situation: Ivan needed Gugayev alive as a hostage to leave Chechnya safely.

Gugayev's militants assault the aul and give chase, but the group escapes on a makeshift raft and takes up defensive positions in an old fortress tower. With the help of a satellite phone taken from Aslan, Medvedev requests support from the Air Force. Russian Mi-24 helicopters arrive, routing the militants, and deliver Medvedev and the group to a military base.

John gives Ivan the cash he promised, of which he shares a thousand pounds with Ruslan. Ivan later gives the remaining money gave to Captain Medvedev for treatment.

The film ends with Ivan's brief comments. Margaret did not marry John. John, having filmed the trip, released a movie and a book, titled "My Life in Russia." After the release of his film, Ivan was brought to trial for "the murder of peaceful citizens of the Russian Federation." Ruslan, who moved to Moscow, testified against Ivan. The only one who stood up for Ivan was Captain Medvedev.

Cast

Film crew

Production
Aleksei Balabanov wrote the scenario for the film in 1998 after he saw on television the severed heads of British specialists working in Chechnya.

Balabanov aspired to make the film incredibly realistic, to the point of naturalism. Before shooting, he interviewed former captives from the First Chechen War, traveled to the villages of Kabardino-Balkaria, met with General Viktor Kazantsev, the commander of the Russian troops in Chechnya, and watched videotapes chronicling Chechen atrocities. Some of these tapes he demonstrated to the English actor Ian Kelly. According to Balabanov, during the showing Kelly was shaking.

The film was shot in Kabardino-Balkaria, North Ossetia, Chechnya, Moscow, St. Petersburg, Tobolsk, and London.

For greater realism, real Chechens played most of the Chechens, and Russian soldiers played most of the troops in the film. Due to the war, the film was only partially filmed on Chechen lands, in particular at the checkpoint at the entrance to Grozny. The film was shot in near-warlike conditions. The shooting took place in quiet areas, and SOBR officers guarded the crew.

When shooting the scenes with the captives in the zindan, the crew dug out a real pit. The actors laid in the wet, filthy hole for several hours, as Balabanov wanted everything to be as realistic as possible. The scene with actress Ingeborga Dapkūnaitė floating naked in a cold rapid was filmed without using a double.

More than anyone, the filming most intimidated the English actor Ian Kelly, who did not understand the Russian language.

During the filming in Kabardino-Balkaria, a helicopter used for the film produced thermal shots, and one of them accidentally got into an ancient Balkar cemetery, as a result of which it caught fire and destroyed many of the graves. The incident almost caused a conflict between the film crew and the residents. Among the SOBR officers guarding the group was a former Chechen captain, who was able to stop the infuriated crowd. On the set, all but Bodrov and Dapkūnaitė lived in the homes of the residents. Balabanov lived in the house of a woman whose ancestors' tombs were destroyed in the incident.

Music

{{tracklist
 |collapsed       = no
 |headline        = Tracklist :
 |extra_column    = Performer

 |title1          = Voina (Война, War)
 |extra1          = Timur Mutsurayev
 |length1         = 0:52

 |title2          = Komandor (Командор, Commander)
 |extra2          = Tomas
 |length2         = 5:14

 |title3          = Volki (Волки, Wolves)
 |extra3          = Bi-2
 |length3         = 5:37
 
 |title4          = SOS
 |extra4          = Splean
 |length4         = 4:30

 |title5          = Bereg (Берег, Coast)
 |extra5          = Vyacheslav Butusov
 |length5         = 4:43

 |title6          = Lyutaya(Лютая, Fierce)
 |extra6          = Volga-Volga
 |length6         = 1:36
 
 |title7          = Chyorny voron (Чёрный ворон, Black Raven)
 |extra7          = Livan and PEKh
 |length7         = 5:53
 
 |title8          = Fellini (Феллини)
 |extra8          = Splean/Bi-2
 |length8         = 5:05

 |title9          = Yeshyo ne vecher (Ещё не вечер, Not yet evening)
 |extra9          = Bi-2
 |length9         = 4:55

 |title10          = ''Plastmassovaya Zhizn (Пластмассовая Жизнь, Plastic Life)
 |extra10          = Splean
 |length10         = 3:31
 
 |title11          = Sokol (Сокол, Falcon)
 |extra11          = Bi-2
 |length11         = 7:07

 |title12          = Kholostye puli (Холостые пули, Blank bullets)
 |extra12          = Partisan radio
 |length12         = 4:11

 |title13          = Moya zvezda (Моя звезда, My star)
 |extra13          = Vyacheslav Butusov and Deadushki
 |length13         = 5:14

 |title14          = Vulitsa (Вулиця, Street)
 |extra14          = Okean Elzy
 |length14         = 5:28

 |title15          = Voina (Volki-2) (Война (Волки-2), War (Wolves-2))
 |extra15          = Bi-2
 |length15         = 4:33
}}Music that was featured in the film, but not included in the soundtrack:'''

Awards and nominations
 2002 - According to leading wholesale companies, the film took fourth place among the 50 best-selling video films in 2002, ahead of a large number of high-budget blockbusters.
 2002, June - XIII Open Russian Film Festival "Kinotavr" in Sochi, the film participated in the contest, winning the Grand Prize.
 2002, August - Yalta Film Festival, Grand Prize.
 2002, August - X "Window to Europe" Film Festival in Vyborg, 3rd place in the "Vyborg Account" nomination.
 2002, October - Montreal World Film Festival, Canada, "Best Actor" (Aleksey Chadov).
 2002, December - Golden Aries Award of the National Guild of Film Critics and Cinematography in the nomination "Best Cinematography" (Sergei Astakhov).
 2003, February - Golden Eagle Award in the nomination "Best Sound" (Maxim Belovolov).
 2003, April - Nika Award in the nomination "Best Actor" (Sergei Bodrov Jr., posthumously).

Similar films 
Prisoner of the Mountains

References

External links 
 

2002 films
Russian action war films
Russian war drama films
Chechen wars films
2000s Russian-language films
2000s English-language films
Chechen-language films
Films about terrorism in Europe
2000s action war films
Films about war correspondents
Films directed by Aleksei Balabanov
Films set in Moscow
Films set in Saint Petersburg
Films set in Siberia
Films set in 2001
Films shot in Moscow
Films shot in the North Caucasus
Films shot in Saint Petersburg
Films shot in Siberia
Military of Russia in films
Prisoner of war films